Strange Brew is a 1983 film.

Strange Brew may also refer to:
 Strange Brew (soundtrack), the soundtrack album from the 1983 film
 "Strange Brew" (song), a 1967 song by Cream from Disraeli Gears
 Strange Brew: The Very Best of Cream, a compilation album
 Strange Brew (computer virus)
 Strange Brew (book), a 2009 fantasy short story anthology edited by P.N. Elrod
 Strangebrew, a Philippine reality situational comedy show

See also
 Strange Old Brew, an album by Carpathian Forest